Stowell is an unincorporated community and census-designated place (CDP) in Chambers County, Texas, United States. The population was 1,743 at the 2020 census.

Geography
Stowell is located on the eastern border of Chambers County at  (29.787468, -94.379386). It is bordered by Winnie to the north and Jefferson County to the east. Texas State Highway 124 passes through Stowell, leading north  to Interstate 10 on the north side of Winnie and south  to High Island on the Gulf of Mexico. Texas State Highway 65 leads west from Stowell  to Anahuac, the Chambers County seat.

Demographics

As of the 2020 United States census, there were 1,743 people, 642 households, and 462 families residing in the CDP.

As of the census of 2000, there were 1,572 people, 564 households, and 433 families residing in the CDP. The population density was 158.7 people per square mile (61.3/km2). There were 619 housing units at an average density of 62.5/sq mi (24.1/km2). The racial makeup of the CDP was 59.80% White, 30.92% African American, 0.64% Native American, 7.82% from other races, and 0.83% from two or more races. Hispanic or Latino of any race were 10.43% of the population.

There were 564 households, out of which 35.8% had children under the age of 18 living with them, 59.8% were married couples living together, 11.0% had a female householder with no husband present, and 23.2% were non-families. 19.0% of all households were made up of individuals, and 8.0% had someone living alone who was 65 years of age or older. The average household size was 2.79 and the average family size was 3.21.

In the CDP, the population was spread out, with 27.9% under the age of 18, 9.8% from 18 to 24, 30.1% from 25 to 44, 22.4% from 45 to 64, and 9.9% who were 65 years of age or older. The median age was 34 years. For every 100 females, there were 103.9 males. For every 100 females age 18 and over, there were 97.2 males.

The median income for a household in the CDP was $32,981, and the median income for a family was $39,792. Males had a median income of $35,154 versus $17,500 for females. The per capita income for the CDP was $15,371. About 10.9% of families and 18.8% of the population were below the poverty line, including 36.3% of those under age 18 and 12.2% of those age 65 or over.

Education
East Chambers Independent School District serves Stowell.

Transportation
Chambers County-Winnie Stowell Airport, a general aviation airport in unincorporated Chambers County, serves Stowell and Winnie.

References

External links
 

Census-designated places in Chambers County, Texas
Census-designated places in Texas
Unincorporated communities in Chambers County, Texas
Unincorporated communities in Texas
Greater Houston